Hanna Popaja (born 29 June 2002) is a Swedish female handball player who plays for Swedish club Lugi HF.

She also represented Sweden in the 2019 European Women's U-17 Handball Championship, were she received silver. She was awarded to the All-Star Team, as best goalkeeper of the tournament.

Achievements 
Youth European Championship:
Silver Medalist: 2019

Individual awards
 All-Star Team Best Goalkeeper of the Youth European Championship: 2019

References
 

2002 births
Living people
Swedish female handball players
Sportspeople from Lund
21st-century Swedish women